Liasis is a genus of pythons found in Indonesia, New Guinea and Australia. Currently, three extant species are recognized and one giant fossil species L. dubudingala, estimated to have been around 10 m (33 ft) in length.

Geographic range
They are found in the Indonesia in the Lesser Sunda Islands, east through New Guinea and in northern and western Australia.

Species

)*Not including the nominate subspecies
)TType species

References

External links

 

 
Snake genera
Taxa named by John Edward Gray